Lake Merced Golf Club is an 18-hole private golf club on the West Coast of the United States, located in Daly City, California, an adjacent suburb south of San Francisco. 

Founded  in 1922, the course opened the following year. Originally designed by Willie Lock, Alister MacKenzie improved the bunkers and areas around the greens in 1929, and Rees Jones handled the course update in 1996. The course lost land on its eastern boundary to eminent domain in the 1960s for the construction of Interstate 280, and several holes were altered, redesigned by Robert Muir Graves.

Lake Merced is a historically Jewish country club, started by Jews in San Francisco who were excluded from the city's other clubs. Today, the club's membership base is predominantly Jewish- and Asian-American.

Tour events
Lake Merced was the site of the Swinging Skirts LPGA Classic for three years (2014–2016) and is now the host of the LPGA Mediheal Championship, held in late April. Lydia Ko won three of the first four events at the course (2014, 2015, 2018).

Course
Back tees

 The nines are switched for the LPGA event.

References

External links

Rees Jones Inc. – Lake Merced Golf Club
Northern California Golf Association – Lake Merced Golf Club

Golf clubs and courses in California
Clubs and societies in California
Sports venues completed in 1922
Sports venues in San Mateo County, California
1922 establishments in California